Mastermind is the sixth studio album by American rapper Rick Ross. It was released on March 3, 2014, by Maybach Music Group and Slip-n-Slide Records, and distributed by Def Jam Recordings. The album features guest appearances from Jay-Z, Jeezy, The Weeknd, Kanye West, Big Sean, Meek Mill, Lil Wayne, French Montana, Diddy, Sizzla, Mavado, Z-Ro and Scarface. The album was supported with the official singles "The Devil Is a Lie", "War Ready" and "Thug Cry", in addition to the promotional singles "Box Chevy", "No Games" and "Nobody".

Mastermind received generally positive reviews from critics. The album debuted at number one on the US Billboard 200, with first-week sales of 179,000 copies in the United States. The album was nominated for Album of the Year at the 2014 BET Hip Hop Awards. Mastermind is also the first of two albums Ross released in 2014, followed eight months later by Hood Billionaire.

Background
In December 2012, it was reported that Ross had begun working on his sixth studio album. On January 1, 2013, he announced he would release the title of his sixth studio album on January 7, 2013. On January 7, 2013, in a promotional video he revealed the title of sixth album would be Mastermind. On June 10, 2013, during an interview with MTV News, he explained that Mastermind will have a soulful vibe, saying: "That's most definitely the feel and that's why I made sure I wanted to open at the top of the new year. I wanted to make that clear for the ones that paid attention that that's most definitely my vibe. I love making those kind of records, those 'Cigar Music' records, those 'Amsterdam' records, and that was most definitely the energy, but I record so much material — we gotta wait and see."

In an October 10, 2013, interview with Civil TV, Ross spoke about the background of the album saying, "In the past year I done seen some things, I done been through some things, so you're going to feel that passion and that aggression. I think the streets are really going to love this." He also said he was putting "the finishing touches" on a song he wanted to get Bobby Womack featured on. In an October 2013 interview with Hot 97, he explained the album title, saying: "It's all about coming from wherever you come from and take it wherever you want to go to. And the minute you do that that's when you can consider yourself a mastermind." In December 2013, during an interview on Hip-Hop Nation, Ross spoke about why he decided to push the album back from its original December 17, 2013, release date, saying: "I'm still putting the final touches on the album. You know me, making that classic is more important than anything and making sure the streets are overwhelmed with what I am doing is what is most important. I'm gonna try to get it to you, and if I don't, I'ma get it to you ASAP."

Recording and production
 
On January 9, 2014, the album was mixed by Diddy. Also in January 2014, Scott Storch confirmed that he provided production on the album. The following month, Mike Will Made It revealed that he had produced a collaboration between Ross and Jeezy for the album. The album was executive produced by Ross and co-produced by Diddy. On February 7, 2014, DJ Mustard revealed that he co-produced "Sanctified" with Kanye West. Ross collaborated with various artists during the album's recording process. The final version of the album would feature Jay-Z, Jeezy, The Weeknd, Sizzla, Mavado, Kanye West, Big Sean, Meek Mill, Lil Wayne, French Montana, Diddy, Scarface and Z-Ro.

In a March 2014, interview with Shaheem Reid, he spoke about how the album's executive producer Diddy was adamant about having the album sound like it was recorded all in the same day, saying: "That's the expertise that Puff bring to the table. The way he orchestrate the music. Myself I'm in the studio—For example, and I'll hear a record come on from a writer's perspective I'm listening to the rhymes, the tones, punch lines, and then the beat. And it's the total opposite when Puff in the studio. He listening to the snare, to the high hat, to the kick. All previous of my five albums whenever I mixed my album and went to master it I could master my album in three hours. With the process Puff put it through it took three days. Yeah, so it was like giving it a '90s feel…I was in the studio. I'm smoking. I'm drinking. And Puff just said 'This album, this album it's missing one thing. We gotta make it feel like it was recorded in the same booth, same day.'"

Release and promotion
On September 16, 2013, Ross announced the Mastermind Tour Dates, a mini-USA tour to promote Mastermind which ran from November 12, 2013 to November 23, 2013. On October 9, 2013, Ross announced on his Twitter account that the album would be released on December 17, 2013. Two days later, a trailer for the album was released. The trailer "chronicles Ross' journey starting in 1999 through a series of fast moving shots quickly covering his come up through the rap ranks." Footage of Jay-Z, Diddy, Birdman, Big Meech, Pablo Escobar and Muhammad Ali are spliced into the video for effect. On January 14, 2014, Def Jam announced that the album would be released on March 4, 2014. On January 24, 2014, the album's cover art was unveiled. On April 3, 2014, the music video was released for "Rich Is Gangsta". On August 3, 2014, the music video was released for "Supreme". On August 4, 2014, the music video was released for "What a Shame" featuring French Montana. On August 27, 2014, the music video was released for "Drug Dealers Dream".

Singles
 
The first promotional single, "Box Chevy", was released on February 15, 2013. The music video was filmed on April 1, 2013, and features cameo appearances from MMG members Gunplay, Stalley and Rockie Fresh. On May 2, 2013, the music video was released for "Box Chevy". The song peaked at number six on the US Bubbling Under R&B/Hip-Hop Singles.

The album's second promotional single, "No Games" featuring Future, was released on September 5, 2013. The song was produced by J.U.S.T.I.C.E. League. The following day it was sent to urban contemporary radio as a single. The music video for "No Games" was filmed on October 10, 2013. The song has since peaked at number 19 on the Bubbling Under R&B/Hip-Hop Singles. On November 3, 2013, the music video was released for "No Games" featuring Future.

On October 23, 2013, Ross announced that the album's first official single, which will feature Jay-Z, will be released in early November 2013. The following day, Ross revealed that the song is titled "The Devil Is a Lie". He explained that song saying, "We're pushing the envelope once again and it's just one of those records I can't wait to hit the streets. We went in another direction but it's just one of those records that's gonna speak for itself and everybody's gonna have their opinion of it, but it's most definitely what the streets need." On December 19, 2013, "The Devil Is a Lie" featuring Jay-Z, was released for digital download. On March 20, 2014, the music video was released for "The Devil Is a Lie".

On January 24, 2014, it was announced that the next single would be titled, "War Ready", and would feature Jeezy. It was then released on February 17, 2014. On February 27, 2014, the music video was released for the third promotional single, "Nobody" featuring French Montana and Diddy. On March 7, 2014, the music video was released for "War Ready" featuring Jeezy.

The album's third official single, "Thug Cry" featuring Lil Wayne, was serviced to mainstream urban radio in the United States on March 13, 2014, and then to rhythmic contemporary radio in the same country on April 1, 2014. On May 5, 2014, the music video was released for "Thug Cry" featuring Lil Wayne.

Critical reception

Mastermind was met with generally positive reviews. At Metacritic, which assigns a normalized rating out of 100 to reviews from professional publications, the album received an average score of 68, based on 23 reviews. Aggregator AnyDecentMusic? gave it 6.3 out of 10, based on their assessment of the critical consensus.

Nick Catucci of Entertainment Weekly said, "As always, he's got a gifted ear for rumbly, deep-gloss beats. "Sanctified", which Kanye produced and raps on, sounds like platinum mallets drumming on shipping containers. His flow too remains flawlessly weighted. He's leisurely and precise even on the theatrically dark "In Vein", where he raps fast to play-off the Weeknd's cynical come-ons. The bleaker the setting, the brighter Ross shines." David Jeffries of AllMusic said, "Mastermind—Ross' annual stomp-and-swagger album, 2014 edition—could be swapped out with 2009's Deeper Than Rap and only those burnt out on the album would know the difference, but when being stuck in a rut means you grind your wheels and all that spews out is gold, you only need to look to successful artists like the always funky James Brown, the always rockin' AC/DC, and the always stoned Devin the Dude for guidance." Jabbari Weekes of Exclaim! stated, "Much like Ross' affinity for mink coats, Mastermind is grandiose in its presentation, but it still only shows the surface of the man behind it." Mikael Wood of the Los Angeles Times said, "As Masterminds mastermind, though, Ross seems on auto-pilot here." Sheldon Pearce of HipHopDX stated, "Mastermind simply lacks flair. It doesn't possess the pizzazz of Teflon Don, which made Ross a power player or the pure gaudiness of Rich Forever, which perfected his aesthetic. Rick Ross has seemingly run out of moves." Brandon Soderberg of Spin said, "This is Ross at his least cohesive and most clueless since his 2006 debut, Port of Miami. He has finally, totally lost himself in malleable self-mythology. His grip on reality has never been especially tight; that he found a way to further lose his way is actually strangely admirable, isn't it?"

Dan Rys of XXL stated, "What Ross does well, and what he does again on Mastermind, is put together a body of work that is as formidable as he is, and taken as a whole it's impossible to call this anything other than a very good album. Where people like Kanye and Drake and Kendrick Lamar keep winning by shaking up the formula and dabbling in the unexpected, Ross long ago identified his lane, and he is the undisputed kingpin of his brash brand of hip-hop. Ross die-hards will not be disappointed; anyone looking for something new and different was probably looking in the wrong place to begin with. Mastermind is a powerful album, an album with an identity, and one that has some solid songs and a handful of hits. Ross delivers just what he promised." Craig Jenkins of Pitchfork said, "Mastermind finds Ross at a Truman Show moment: his character's reached the logical end of its universe. Going forward, he can either break out or keep up a jig he knows that we know is way past expired." Kevin Ritchie of Now said, "A tighter track list homing in on its sombre (and stoner) moods would've been bolder, but to his credit Ross avoids commercial trendiness in favour of more personal – if familiar – forays into Philly soul, funk, 90s hip-hop and South Beach glam (courtesy of producer Scott Storch on the stellar Supreme)." Michael Madden of Consequence of Sound said, "The main tenet of Ross's Maybach Music Group is loyalty, and Ross is loyal to his fans on Mastermind: it's more or less what we're used to from him. It sounds like the album Ross wanted to make, as inspired by heroes like Dilla, and Onyx, and Wu-Tang Clan, and Biggie, and Camp Lo."

Accolades
Complex named it the eighteenth best album of the first half of 2014. Writing for them, Justin Charity said, "Like all of Rick Ross' albums, Mastermind is expansively gorgeous. It's cohesive without being 'concept'. [...] "The Devil Is a Lie," which features Jay Z, and "War Ready" are Mastermind's biggest, most lethal beats, bookended by blues and reggae relief. With time, "Sanctified" emerged as the post-Yeezus Kanye collaboration that a real thug would've killed for. This is a perfectly respectable third encore from a rap champion who, if the critics have their say, really could use one of those lavish vacations he boasts about."

Commercial performance
Mastermind debuted at number one on the Billboard 200, with first-week sales of 179,000 copies in the United States. In its second week, the album dropped to number three on the chart, selling 49,000 more copies. In its third week, the album dropped to number seven on the chart, selling 27,000 more copies. In its fourth week, the album dropped to number eleven, selling 19,000 more copies. As of January 2015, the album has sold 397,000 copies in the United States.

Track listing
Credits were adapted from the album's liner notes and BMI.

Notes
  signifies a co-producer
  signifies an additional producer
 "Intro" contains additional vocals by Robin Leonard
 "Shots Fired" contains additional vocals by Cira Larkin
 "Nobody" contains background vocals by Teedra Moses, and additional vocals by Diddy
 "War Ready" contains background vocals by Tracy T
 "Supreme" contains additional vocals by Katt Williams and Keith Sweat
 "Dope Bitch" contains vocals RK, Money Marie, and Tak (the underboss)
 "Sanctified" contains additional vocals by Betty Wright
 "Thug Cry" contains additional vocals by Betty Idol

Samples
 "Rich Is Gangsta" contains a sample of "Soul Searching" performed by Average White Band.
 "Nobody" contains a sample of "You're Nobody (Till Somebody Kills You)", written by Sean Combs, Stevie Jordan, George Johnson Jr, Ephrem Lopez, Jean Louhisdon, Billy Preston, and Christopher Wallace.
 "The Devil Is a Lie" contains a sample of "Don't Let Your Love Fade Away" performed by Gene Williams, written by Lee Harris and Ellie Taylor.
 "What a Shame" contains elements of "Shame on a Nigga", written by Dennis Coles, Robert Diggs, Gary Grice, Lamont Hawkins, Jason Hunter, Russell Jones, Clifford Smith, and Corey Woods; a sample of "It Takes Two" by Lyn Collins; and interpolations of "Luchini", written by Richard Randolph, Clifford Smith, Kevin Spencer, Christopher Wallace, David Willis, and Salahadeen Wilds.
 "Supreme" contains elements of "Is It Love You're After", written by Miles Gregory.
 "Thug Cry" contains a sample of "93 Til Infinity" performed by Souls of Mischief, written by Adam Carter, Billy Cobham, Opio Lindsey, Tajai Massey, and Damani Thompson.

Credits and personnel
Credits for Mastermind adapted from AllMusic.

 A+ – producer
 Chris Athens – mastering
 Chris Atlas – marketing
 Sam Berry IV – assistant engineer
 Alex "Gucci Pucci" Bethune – executive producer
 Big Sean – featured artist
 Bink – producer
 Black Metaphor – producer
 Sam Bohl – assistant engineer
 Michael "Banger" Cahadia – vocal engineer
 Dustin Capulong – assistant engineer
 Anthony Cruz – vocal engineer
 Mike Dean – instrumentation, producer
 Diddy – additional production, executive producer, producer
 Ben Diehl – engineer
 DJ Enuff – producer
 DJ Khaled – executive producer
 Dernst "D'Mile" Emile II – additional music, bass
 French Montana – vocals, vocals (background)
 Noah Goldstein – engineer
 Jason Guida – assistant engineer
 Eldwardo "Eddie Mix" Hernandez – engineer
 Victoria Holland – assistant engineer
 Stevie J. – producer
 Jaycen Joshua – mixing
 Jay-Z – featured artist
 Jeezy – featured artist
 J.U.S.T.I.C.E. League – producer
 Anes Ansouri – vocals
 Ryan Kaul – mixing assistant
 John "J-Banga" Kercy – engineer
 Cira Larkin – vocals
 Robin Leonard – vocals
 Lil Wayne – featured artist
 Pamela Littky – photography
 Deborah Mannis-Gardner – sample clearance
 Fabian Marasciullo – mixing
 Hector Marin – producer
 Mavado – featured artist
 Tadarius McCombs – guitar (bass)
 Stephen McDowell – assistant engineer, engineer
 Dijon McFarlane – producer
 Willie McNeal – producer
 Meek Mill – featured artist
 Michelle Trumpler – engineer
 Mike Will Made It – producer
 Zeke Mishanec – assistant engineer
 Money Marie – vocals
 Teedra Moses – vocals (background)
 Jason Patterson – vocal engineer
 Jiv Pos – producer
 Andy Proctor – package production
 Jason Quenneville – producer, vocal engineer
 Rony Rey – vocal engineer
 D Rich – producer
 Ramon Rivas – vocal engineer
 John Rivers – engineer
 RK – vocals
 Todd Robinson – assistant engineer
 Leshawn Rogers – producer
 Rick Ross – executive producer, primary artist
 Sizzla – featured artist
 Sharif Slater – producer
 Stephen "Di Genius" McGregor – vocal engineer
 Scott Storch – producer
 Keith Sweat – vocals
 Tracy T. – vocals (background)
 Tak – vocals
 Matthew Testa – engineer
 Omar Walker – producer
 The Weeknd – featured artist, producer
 Dawud West – package design
 Kanye West – featured artist, producer
 Whole Slab – vocals
 Katt Williams – vocals
 Betty Wright – vocals

Charts

Weekly charts

Year-end charts

References

2014 albums
Albums produced by Bink (record producer)
Albums produced by DJ Mustard
Albums produced by J.U.S.T.I.C.E. League
Albums produced by Kanye West
Albums produced by Mike Will Made It
Albums produced by Scott Storch
Def Jam Recordings albums
Maybach Music Group albums
Rick Ross albums
Albums produced by Stevie J
Albums produced by Mike Dean (record producer)
Albums produced by Boi-1da
Albums produced by Timbaland
Albums produced by Jerome "J-Roc" Harmon
Albums produced by DJ Khaled
Albums produced by Vinylz